Brian Thomas Adams (born 18 May 1947) is an English former footballer who played as a midfielder in the Football League for Millwall. He began his senior career with Chelsea, without playing for them in the League, and went on to play non-league football for Wimbledon.

References

1947 births
Living people
Footballers from Tottenham
English footballers
Association football midfielders
Chelsea F.C. players
Millwall F.C. players
Wimbledon F.C. players
English Football League players